Eggleston is a village in County Durham, England.

Eggleston may also refer to:

Eggleston, Minnesota, an unincorporated community in Goodhue County, Minnesota USA
Eggleston, Virginia, an unincorporated community in Giles County, Virginia USA
Egglestone Abbey, a ruined abbey in County Durham, England
Eggleston Hall, a privately owned 19th-century country house near Barnard Castle
Eggleston School, a listing on National Register of Historic Places in Nester Township, Michigan

People with the surname
Alan Eggleston (born 1941), Australian Senator
Benjamin Eggleston (1816–1888), U.S. Representative from Ohio
Charles Eggleston (1945–1968), photographer with United Press International 
Edward Eggleston (1837–1902), American historian and novelist
Edward Mason Eggleston (1882-1941), painter, commercial illustrator in New York City
Elizabeth Eggleston (1934–1976), Australian activist, author, lawyer and champion for Indigenous Australians
Frederic Eggleston (1875–1954), Australian lawyer, politician and diplomat
Geoffrey Eggleston (1944–2008), Australian poet
George Cary Eggleston (1839–1911), American writer 
Jeffrey Eggleston (born 1984), American runner
John W. Eggleston (1886–1976), chief justice of the Virginia Supreme Court of Appeals
Joseph Dupuy Eggleston (1867–1953), seventh President of Virginia Polytechnic Institute and State University
Joseph Eggleston (1754–1811), American planter, soldier, and politician
Mack Eggleston (1896–1980), U.S. baseball player
Ralph Eggleston (1965–2022), art director and writer at Pixar Animation Studios
Rushad Eggleston (born 1979), contemporary improvisational cellist
Tommy Eggleston (1920–2004), English footballer and manager 
Verna Eggleston, American public servant
Neil Eggleston (born 1953), American attorney who served as the White House Counsel under President Barack Obama
Willard Webster Eggleston (1863–1935), American botanist
Wilfrid Eggleston (1901–1986), Canadian journalist and chief censor for Canada
William Eggleston (born 1939), American photographer

See also
Egglestone (disambiguation)